The Red Series of Suske en Wiske (known in English as Spike and Suzy) are popular series of Dutch comics. The name of these series originated in the red covers of the albums. They comprise most of the Spike and Suzy books, all others fitting into The Blue Series or the specials.

List of the Red Series albums

In this section, the date refers to the date of the first (i.e. non-coloured until 1964) print of the given album. All the following albums have the same date, until a new date has been given to an album. This date is not the same as the date of the first 'coloured' print. A reference between those editions has been given.

Note: the title of album 21 has been reprinted with the corrected title from 1956 onwards. A few other titles have minor changes between the original edition and newer editions as well. Some of the newer editions are also redrawn, some are only edited.

If an album has been published in English, the English title is given as well, preceded by S&S (if the series was titled Spike and Suzy), W&W (for Willy and Wanda), or B&B (for Bob & Bobette). All of these books have also been published in French, though in a slightly different order.

Early albums (1946–1964)

1946
0.  (not included in the series until the reedition as #154)

1947
1.  (reedited as #68) (W&W: An Island called Hoboken)

1948
2.  (reedited as #65 and as #87)
3.  (reedited as #42 and #107) (W&W: The Zincshrinker)

1949
4.  (reedited as #105) (W&W: The King drinks)
5.  (reedited as #129)
6.  (reedited as #140)

1950
7.  (reedited as #134)
8.  (reedited as #138) (W&W: A Fool's Gold)
9.  (reedited as #144)

1951
10.  (reedited as #132)	(W&W: The "Tender-hearted" Matador)	
11.  (reedited as #145) (W&W: The Iron Flowerpotters)
12.  (reedited as #131)
13.  (reedited as #137)

1952
14.  (reedited as #133)
15.  (reedited as #141)
16.  (reedited as #146)

1953
17.  (reedited as #148)
18.  (reedited as #59 and #89) (W&W: The Merry Musketeers)
19.  (reedited as #88)

1954
20.  (reedited as #127) (S&S: Highland Games)
21.  (reedited as #56 and #81) (W&W: The Circus Baron)
22.  (reedited as #55 and #91), loosely based on The Prisoner of Zenda

1955
23.  (reedited as #60 and #76)	
24.  (reedited as #95)

1956
25.  (reedited as #83)
26.  (reedited as #136)
27.  (reedited as #58 and #80)

1957
28.  (reedited as #52 and #70)
29.  (reedited as #64 and #93)
30.  (reedited as #62 and #84)

1958
31.  (reedited as #142)
32.  (reedited as #119)
33.  (reedited as #120)
34.  (reedited as #121)

1959
35.  (reedited as #123)
36.  (reedited as #124)
37.  (reedited as #125) (B&B: The Texas Rangers)

1960
38.  (reedited as #126)
39.  (reedited as #118)
40.  (reedited as #110)

1961
41.  (reedited as #109)
42.  (reedition of #3; reedited as #107) 
43.  (reedited as #103)

1962
44.  (reedited as #104) 
45.  (reedited as #98)		
46.  (reedited as #101)

1963
47.  (reedited as #99) 		
48.  (reedited as #96)
49.  (reedited as #94)

1964
50.  (reedited as #90)

Two-coloured (uniform Flemish-Dutch version: 51–66)
51.  (reedited as #69)
52.  (reedition of #28; reedited as #70)	
53.  (reedited as #73)

1965
54.  (reedited as #74)
55.  (reedition of #22; reedited as #91)
56.  (reedition of #21; reedited as #81)
57.  (reedited as #85)
58.  (reedition of #27; reedited as #80)
59.  (reedition of #18; reedited as #89)
60.  (reedition of #23; reedited as #76)
61.  (reedited as #77)
62.  (reedition of #30; reedited as #84)

1966
63.  (reedited as #72) 
64.  (reedition of #29; reedited as #93)
65.  (reedition of #2; reedited as #87)
66.  (reedited as #78)

Four colours (67–...)

1967
67.  
68.  (reedition of #1)
69.  (reedition of #51)
70.  (reedition of #28 and #52)
71. 
72.  (reedition of #63)
73.  (reedition of #53)
74.  (reedition of #54)
75. 
76. (reedition of #23 and #60)
77.  (reedition of #61)
78.  (reedition of #66)

1968
79. 
80.  (reedition of #27 and #58)
81.  (reedition of #21 and #56)
82. 
83.  (reedition of #25)
84.  (reedition of #30 and #62)
85.  (reedition of #57)
86. 
87.  (reedition of #2)

1969
88.  (reedition of #19)
89.  (reedition of #18 and #59)
90.  (reedition of #50)
91.  (reedition of #22 and #55)
92. 
93.  (reedition of #29 and #64)
94.  (reedition of #49)
95.  (reedition of #24)
96.  (reedition of #48)
97. 
98.  (reedition of #45)
99.  (reedition of #47)
100.

1970
101.  (reedition of #46) (W&W: Dancing Cards)
102. 
103.  (reedition of #43)
104.  (reedition of #44)
105.  (reedition of #4)
106. 
107.  (reedition of #3 and #42)
108. 
109.  (reedition of #41)
110.  (reedition of #40)

1971
111.  (reedition of The Blue Series)
112.  (reedition of The Blue Series)
113.  (reedition of The Blue Series)
114.  (reedition of The Blue Series)
115.  (reedition of The Blue Series)
116.  (reedition of The Blue Series)
117. 
118.  (reedition of #39)
119.  (reedition of #32)
120.  (reedition of #33)
121.  (reedition of #34)
122. 
123.  (reedition of #35)
124.  (reedition of #36) (B&B: The Flying Bed)
125.  (reedition of #37)
126.  (reedition of #38)

1972
127.  (reedition of #20)
128. 
129.  (reedition of #5)
130. 
131.  (reedition of #12)
132.  (reedition of #10)
133.  (reedition of #14)
134.  (reedition of #7)
135. 
136.  (reedition of #26)
137.  (reedition of #13)

1973
138.  (reedition of #8)
139. 
140.  (reedition of #6)
141.  (reedition of #15)
142.  (reedition of #31)
143. 
144.  (reedition of #9)
145.  (reedition of #11)
146.  (reedition of #16)

1974
147. 
148.  (reedition of #17)
149. 
150.  (reedition of The Blue Series)
151. 
152.

1975
153. 
154.  (reedition of #0: last reedition)
155. 
156. 
157.

1976
158. 
159. 
160. 
161.  (B&B: The Diamond Boomerang)
162.

1977
163. 
164. 
165. 
166.

1978
167. 
168.  (S&S: The Fairies of Efteling)
169. 
170.

1979
171. 
172. 
173. 
174. 
175. 
176.  (B&B: The Plunderers)

1980
177. 
178. 
179. 
180. 
181.

1981
182. 
183. 
184. 
185.

1982
186. 
187. 
188. 
189. 
190. 
191.

1983
192. 
193. 
194. 
195. 
196.

1984
197. 
198. 
199.  (S&S: The Secret of the Incas)
200.

1985
201. 
202. 
203.  (B&B: The Poisoned Rain)
204.

1986
205. 
206.  (B&B: Kingdom of the Sea-snails)
207. 
208.

1987
209. 
210. 
211. 
212.

1988
213. 
214.  (W&W: The Jewel in the Lotus)
215. 
216. 
217.  (B&B: The Amazing Coconut)

1989
218.  (S&S: The Circle of Power)
219. 
220.  (S&S: Sagarmatha)
221.  (B&B: Rhino Rescue)
222.

1990
223. 
224. 
225. 
226.

1991
227. 
228. 
229. 
230.

1992
231. 
232. 
233. 
234.

1993
235. 
236. 
237. 
238.

1994
239. 
240. 
241. 
242.

1995
243. 
244. 
245. 
246.

1996
247. 
248. 
249. 
250.

1997
251. 
252. 
253. 
254.

1998
255. 
256. 
257. 
258.

1999
259. 
260. 
261. 
262.

2000
263. 
264. 
265. 
266. 
267.

2001
268. 
269. 
270. 
271. Big Mother
272.

2002
273. 
274. 
275. 
276. 
277.

2003
278. 
279. 
280. 
281.

2004
282. 
283. 
284. 
285.

2005
286. 
287. 
288. 	
289.

2006
290.  (two short stories that were published earlier in magazines were compiled)
291. 
292. 
293.

2007
294. 
295. 
296.  (first book to come with a brand-new look for the front cover)
297. 
298.

2008
299. 
300. 
301. 
302.

2009
303. 
304. 
305. 
306.

2010
307. 
308. 
309. 
310. 
311.

2011
312. 
313. 
314. 
315.

2012
316. 
317. 
318. 
319. 
320.

2013
321. 
322. 
323. 
324.

2014
325. 
326. 
327. 
328.

2015
329. 
330. 
331. 
332.

2016
333. 
334. 
335. 
336. 
337. Game of drones

2017
338. 
339.  (first book in the brand-new A4 series)
340. 
341. 
342.

2018
343. 
344. 
345. 
346.

2019
347. 
348. 
349. 
350.

2020
351. 
352. 
353. 
354. 
355.

2021
356. 
357. 
358. 
359. 
360.

2022
361. 
362. 
363. 
364. 
365.

2023
366. 
367. 
368. 
369. 
370.

See also
 The Blue Series
 List of Spike and Suzy books in English
 Spike and Suzy
 Willy Vandersteen
 List of Suske en Wiske albums

External links 
 List of English translations of Spike and Suzy

Lists of comics
Belgian comics titles
Spike and Suzy